Albrecht Zaborowskij (also rendered Saboroweski; anglicized as Albert Zabriskie; 1638–1711) of Prussia (present-day Poland and Russia) settled in what is now New Jersey on August 31, 1662.

Early life and emigration
Saborowski, a Lutheran, was born in 1638, perhaps in the Prussian town of Insterburg. After the Thirty Years' War upheavals in Europe, he decided to emigrate to America, as one of the pioneers of European colonization within the area of present-day New Jersey. In 1662 "Albert Saboriski, from Enghestburgh Prussia" arrived on board the Dutch ship De Vos(The Fox) to New Amsterdam (present-day New York City).

New Amsterdam
Due to his good knowledge of Native American languages, mostly Lenape languages, he became a translator and mediator in negotiations between the colonists and Native American tribes, specifically the Lenape. He came into possession of a large estate within the Province of New Jersey and built a family residence in Hackensack (11,007 acres of land).

Family
His  marriage to Machtelt Vanderlinde on January 8, 1677 produced five children born from this relationship: Jacob, Jan, Joost, Christian and Hendrick. Albert died in 1711 and was buried in Hackensack. He originated America's Zabriskie family, which produced several eminent descendants, such as [(Peter Zabriskie)] son of Jan Zabriskie, Albrecht's second son. Peter Zabriskie (1721-1791) was a resident of Hackensack, New Jersey and an ardent American Revolutionary. Peter opened his home to General George Washington as the Revolutionary Army retreated across the Hudson River from the battle of New York City.  Peter Zabriskie served as a Colonel in the Revolutionary Army and was captured by the British Army.  Legend has it that he said to the British upon hearing one of them exclaim, "Long live King George," "Yes, indeed!  Long Live King George Washington!"  Peter escaped his captors and lived on to be a Judge for Bergen County, New Jersey and moreover one of three Ratifying Signers of the United States Constitution representing Bergen County, New Jersey.  Other Zabriskie's of note were businessman Christian Brevoort Zabriskie who was a partner of [(Francis Marion Smith)]the founder of Twenty Mule Team Borax and for whom Zabriskie Point in Death Valley is named, George Olin Zabriskie, a genealogist and author: yet one who sadly omitted the names of any African-American Zabriskie's one of whom is Peter J. Zabriskie) graduate of Howard University and Envoy of John F. Kennedy to Africa for the Peace Corp Program, also Norma Damon Zabriskie-Heaton, a woman who worked with Marshall Nirenberg to decipher the genetic code.

Quoting George Olin's "The Zabriskie Family": "In recent times a small branch of the family used a Zobriskie spelling, and a tiny western branch still uses Zabrisky.  No living members of the family have been found who use Zabriski.  Those using this spelling who responded to  research queries are from recently immigrated families who have adopted this form of our surname. And mot all who use the regular spelling are true members of this particular family since some are newcomers and some are colored people. (It has been a real task to sort them out and exclude them from this history: and some of those listed a "unknown" may belong to these categories..).

Wrong information

If you see a user changes this page saying Albert Zaborowski was Jan Lubbertzen, that is incorrect information. There is no proof. He is possibly from the Zaborowski family, since there is a Olbrecht Zaborowski living in the US at the time, and Albert is also sometimes referred to in records as Olbrecht Zaborowski.

References

1638 births
1711 deaths
People from Hackensack, New Jersey
People from the Duchy of Prussia
Prussian emigrants to the United States
People of New Netherland
Immigrants to the Thirteen Colonies